John Garth may refer to:

 John Garth (author), English journalist and Tolkien scholar
 John Garth (composer) (1721–1810), English composer
 John Garth (politician) (c. 1701–1764), British lawyer and politician
 John S. Garth (1909–1993), American naturalist